Frank Valeriote (born August 15, 1954) is a Canadian politician. He was elected as the Liberal Member of Parliament in 2008 by a small margin over the Conservative candidate Gloria Kovach and subsequently served as MP until October 2015. Valeriote chose not to run in the 2015 federal election. In an interview with the Guelph Mercury newspaper in November 2014, he cited a desire to spend more time with his two young children. "I feel it is important in a meaningful way to be there for their millionth step as they enter their teenage years as it was to see their first step." In a later interview, he confirmed his plan to return to legal practice, "I'm physically, emotionally, and psychologically preparing for the move from member of parliament to an active lawyer at Smith Valeriote." On October 26, 2015, SmithValeriote Law Firm LLP welcomed Frank Valeriote back to the practice where he had been a senior partner until his election as a Member of Parliament.

Background

Valeriote is the grandson of Italian immigrants and was born and raised in Guelph, Ontario. His father, Domenic (Mico) Valeriote, was an accomplished long distance runner and one of the longest-serving members of Guelph City Council. He earned an undergraduate degree in history and economics from the University of Western Ontario before earning his law degree from the University of Ottawa. He was called to the bar in 1981 and returned to Guelph to co-found the law firm of SmithValeriote LLP, where he served as a senior partner until his election.

He served on the local Catholic School Board for 18 years including several as chair. He also served as a member of the Guelph and Wellington Housing Authority for 9 years.

Valeriote married Catherine Berry, a psychotherapist and counsellor in 2001; they have two children. The couple separated in 2013.

Political career
Valeriote was initially selected as the Liberal candidate in the 2008 Guelph by-election, following the resignation of Brenda Chamberlain from the House of Commons. However, the issuance of writs for the 2008 federal election pre-empted the Guelph by-election.

On election day, Valeriote defeated the Conservative candidate, longtime city councillor Gloria Kovach, by less than 1,800 votes.

In 2011, he was re-elected, with 25,574 votes (43.37%), to 19,252 (32.65%) for Conservative Marty Burke, 9,836 (16.68%) for New Democrat Bobbi Stewart, 3,711 (6.29%) for Green John Lawson, and scatterings for four other candidates.

Based on an incident during the 2011 election campaign, Valeriote's Liberal riding association was fined by the Canadian Radio-television and Telecommunications Commission for violations of the Unsolicited Telecommunications Rules.
As reported by the National Post, this fine was based on a robocall message sent on April 30, 2011 that anonymously attacked his Conservative opponent’s alleged position on abortion. The call failed to identify its originator and did not give a callback number, according to the National Post article. Under a settlement agreement with Valeriote, the CRTC assessed a $4,900 fine. According to CBC News, "Valeriote admitted the robocalls originated with his team but said it was an attempt to respond to an issue raised during the campaign and was not meant to suppress votes".

On November 13, 2014, Valeriote announced that he would not be seeking re-election in 2015. At the time of that announcement, Valeriote was the Liberal critic for veterans affairs, and the vice chair of the standing committee on veterans affairs, according to CBC News. He subsequently endorsed the new Liberal candidate, Lloyd Longfield who went on to win the riding by an overwhelming majority in the federal election held on Oct. 19, 2015.

Electoral record

References

External links

1954 births
Living people
Canadian people of Italian descent
Liberal Party of Canada MPs
Members of the House of Commons of Canada from Ontario
People from Guelph
University of Western Ontario alumni
University of Ottawa Faculty of Law alumni
21st-century Canadian politicians